Michael Haydn's Symphony No. 28 in C major, Opus 1 No. 2, Perger 19, Sherman 28, MH 384, was written in Salzburg in 1784, was the third and last symphony published in his lifetime. The publisher, Artaria, also published several of Joseph Haydn's symphonies.

Scored for 2 oboes, 2 bassoons, 2 horns, 2 trumpets, timpani and strings, in three movements:

Allegro spiritoso
Un poco adagio, in F major
Fugato: Vivace assai

This is the first of Haydn's symphonies to conclude with the kind of fugato "that Haydn introduced in several of his late symphonies and which so clearly forecast Mozart's procedures in the "Jupiter" Symphony." (Sherman, 1988)

Charles Sherman based his 1988 edition of the score for Ludwig Doblinger on the Artaria edition but compared it with a Breitkopf & Härtel score of 1895 and manuscript parts from the Kroměříž castle in Moravia.

References
 A. Delarte, "A Quick Overview Of The Instrumental Music Of Michael Haydn" Bob's Poetry Magazine November 2006: 23 PDF
 Charles H. Sherman and T. Donley Thomas, Johann Michael Haydn (1737 - 1806), a chronological thematic catalogue of his works. Stuyvesant, New York: Pendragon Press (1993)
 C. Sherman, "Johann Michael Haydn" in The Symphony: Salzburg, Part 2 London: Garland Publishing (1982): lxviii
 C. Sherman, Foreword to score of Sinfonia in C, Perger 19 Vienna: Doblinger K. G. (1988)

Symphony 28
Compositions in C major
1784 compositions